Salto Abajo is a barrio in the municipality of Utuado, Puerto Rico. Its population in 2010 was 3,929.

Geography

History
Puerto Rico was ceded by Spain in the aftermath of the Spanish–American War under the terms of the Treaty of Paris of 1898 and became an unincorporated territory of the United States. In 1899, the United States Department of War conducted a census of Puerto Rico finding that the population of Salto Abajo barrio was 836.

Features
The rope bridge in Salto Abajo was destroyed by Hurricane Maria in 2017. Engineering students from the University of New Mexico and University of Texas at El Paso began its reconstruction but never completed the work.

Gallery

See also

 List of communities in Puerto Rico

References

Barrios of Utuado, Puerto Rico